The Human Torch, also known as Jim Hammond (originally, Hamond), is a superhero appearing in American comic books published by Marvel Comics. Created by writer-artist Carl Burgos, he first appeared in Marvel Comics #1 (Oct. 1939), published by Marvel's predecessor, Timely Comics.

The "Human" Torch was actually an android created by scientist Phineas Horton, off of the tutelage of Victor Timely. He possessed the ability to surround himself with fire and control flames. In his earliest appearances, he was portrayed as a science fiction monstrosity, but quickly became a hero and adopted a secret identity as a police officer for the New York City Police Department.

The Human Torch was one of Timely Comics' three signature characters, along with Captain America and Namor the Sub-Mariner. Like many superheroes, the Human Torch fell into obscurity by the 1950s. In 1961, Stan Lee and Jack Kirby repurposed his name and powers for a new character, Johnny Storm, a member of the Fantastic Four (who was actually a human mutate). Unlike Captain America and the Sub-Mariner, the original Human Torch has had only a small presence in the post-1950s Marvel comic books and is closely associated with the Golden Age.

Publication history
Following his debut in the hit Marvel Comics #1, the Human Torch proved popular enough that he soon became one of the first superheroes to headline a solo title. Through the 1940s, the Torch starred or was featured in Marvel Mystery Comics (the book's title beginning with issue #2), The Human Torch (premiering with issue #2, Fall 1940, having taken over the numbering of the defunct Red Raven Comics), and Captain America Comics #19, 21–67, 69, 76–77, as well as appearing in several issues of All Select Comics, All Winners Comics, and Young Allies Comics.

Seeing a natural "fire and water" theme, Timely was responsible for comic books' first major crossover, with a two-issue battle between the Human Torch and the Sub-Mariner that spanned Marvel Mystery Comics #8–9—telling the same story from the two characters' different perspectives.

Marvel Mystery Comics ended its run with #92 (June 1949), and The Human Torch with #35 (March 1949), as superheroes in general had faded in popularity. Timely Comics publisher Martin Goodman—who by the early 1950s had transitioned the company to its next iteration, as Atlas Comics—attempted to revive superheroes with the anthology comic Young Men #24–28 (Dec. 1953 – June 1954), starring the Human Torch (art by Syd Shores and Dick Ayers, variously, with covers and initially some panels featuring the Torch redrawn by Burgos for style consistency), along with the Sub-Mariner and Captain America. The solo title The Human Torch returned for issues #36–38 (April–Aug. 1954) before again being canceled. The Torch also appeared in stories in the briefly revived Captain America Comics and Sub-Mariner Comics, and in the anthology Men's Adventures #28 (July 1954).

The original Human Torch debuted in present-day Marvel Comics continuity in Fantastic Four Annual #4 (Nov. 1966).

Human Torch appeared as a regular character in the 2010–2013 Secret Avengers series, from issue #23 (April 2012) through its final issue #37 (March 2013).

Starting in 2014, the Human Torch began appearing as a main character in the Marvel NOW! relaunch of The Invaders.

Fictional character biography

Early life

The Human Torch was a humanoid android created by Professor Phineas Horton in his lab in Brooklyn, New York for "scientific" purposes. At a press-conference unveiling, however, Horton's creation burst into flames when exposed to oxygen. The android showed human-like sentience, personality, and awareness, but the spectators feared that he posed a safety threat. Public outcry led to the Torch being sealed in concrete, though he escaped due to a crack that let oxygen seep in. The Torch then inadvertently caused parts of New York City to burn and, after dealing with a mobster who wanted to gain advantage of his abilities for fire insurance (and accidentally causing the mobster's death in an explosion), he eventually learned to control his flame, rebelled against his creator, and vowed to help humanity.

The Torch later first encountered and battled Namor the Sub-Mariner.

He would join other heroes as war broke out in Europe, and later in the Pacific, to fight the Axis powers. In his solo title's debut issue, he acquired a young partner, Thomas "Toro" Raymond, the mutant son of two nuclear scientists whose exposure to radiation gave him the ability to control fire. The Human Torch also joined the New York City police force as part of his "human cover" under the name James "Jim" Hammond. He would later drop the human name and serve the police force outright as the Human Torch, fighting villains and his off-and-on foe, the Sub-Mariner.

Both the Torch and the Sub-Mariner joined with Captain America and his partner Bucky as the core of the superhero team the Invaders, fighting Nazis during World War II (in retcon stories that premiered in 1970s comics). With the Invaders, he was soon brainwashed by the Red Skull and battled the Liberty Legion. He later gave a blood transfusion to Jacqueline Falsworth, giving her superhuman powers to become Spitfire.

The Torch, the Sub-Mariner, Captain America, and Bucky banded together with the Whizzer, and Miss America in post-war America in a subsequent super-team, the All-Winners Squad (the original Captain America and Bucky's membership were later retconned as having been the second Captain America and Bucky). In Marvel continuity, the Human Torch was responsible for the death of Adolf Hitler. When the Russians were invading Berlin, the Torch and Toro broke into Hitler's bunker just as he was about to commit suicide, to offer him the chance to surrender himself to the Americans, rather than the Russians. Hitler lunged for a red switch, presumed by the Torch to be a bomb. In return, the Human Torch blasted fire at Hitler, burning him alive.

Sometime afterward, the Torch was placed in deactivation sleep in the Mojave Desert; an atomic bomb test awoke him. Learning that Toro had been captured by the Soviets and brainwashed, the Torch rescued his old partner and learned that the nuclear bomb's radiation had made his powers both much stronger and more unstable.

To keep Toro a young boy, the writers retconned the character slightly, claiming the Torch met him after World War II rather than at the beginning of the war. The revival lasted five issues. Later writers explained how fearing he would become a danger to those around him, the Torch flew back out into the desert and went nova, using up his energy reserve and effectively deactivating himself.

Reactivation and joining Avengers West Coast

In modern-day continuity, the supervillain the Mad Thinker reactivated the Torch to have him battle the Fantastic Four, deactivating him when the Torch refused to kill the heroes. A storyline in the Avengers that dealt with the secret background of its android member, the Vision revealed that the Torch's body had been found by a renegade robot named Ultron 5, and modified to become the Vision, his mind wiped of past memories and his powers altered with the coerced help of the Human Torch's original creator, Phineas Horton. The seed of this idea was planted by artist Neal Adams and worked out in detail in The Avengers #133–135 (May–June 1975) by writer Steve Englehart.

A later story by Roy Thomas in What If? #4 (Aug. 1977), planted the suggestion that the Vision was actually made from a second android created by Horton, named Adam II. This freed up the Human Torch for a possible revival. This was followed up by John Byrne, who had the Scarlet Witch revive the Torch in Avengers West Coast, seeking answers about her husband, the Vision, and to help Ann Raymond, wife of Tom "Toro" Raymond. In these stories, it was determined that the Vision had been made by Ultron out of the Torch's spare parts, which explained their physical similarities. The Torch served the Avengers for many issues before losing his powers to save the former superheroine Spitfire in the 1990s series Namor. His powers gone, the Torch settled down with Ann Raymond.

He became the Chief of Security for Oracle, Inc., and would appear later as the CEO of Oracle, Inc., a company run by Namor. There he ran the mercenary team Heroes for Hire, and his mysterious connection to the Vision was furthered when Ant-Man (Scott Lang) declared that his internal mechanisms were not merely similar, but identical to the Vision's, despite the profound differences in their appearance and powers. During the time-travel adventure Avengers Forever, the Avengers subsequently discovered Immortus, the custodian of Limbo, had used a device called the Forever Crystal to diverge the Torch's personal timeline while keeping the two outcomes concurrent. According to this explanation, the Human Torch is the Vision, but also continues to exist as himself.

When Oracle, Inc., was closed down and Heroes for Hire disbanded, Hammond was soon asked to head Citizen V's V-Battalion upon the retirement of Roger Aubrey, the Destroyer. While on leave from the V-Battalion as field leader of the New Invaders, he became attached to Tara, a female android based on him, whom he came to regard as a daughter of sorts. He also renewed acquaintances with Spitfire, to the dismay of her beau, Union Jack (Joey Chapman). Tara was revealed to have been created by the Red Skull; overrides on her developing personality allowed the Invaders' enemies, the Axis Mundi, to use her as a weapon against the team. As Tara heated toward overload to kill the Invaders, the Torch channeled her heat to prevent her meltdown. With his own systems then overloading, he flew high into the atmosphere, away from where he could cause harm, and detonated.

The Torch's remains were recovered by the United Nations and sequestered for research. They were subsequently stolen by professor Zhang Chin, who used the Torch's chemistry to create a virus weapon that caused infected persons to immolate. Captain America (Barnes) and the Sub-Mariner stopped the attack, and were able to pressure the U.S. Government into burying the Torch with full military honors.

The superhuman training camp created in the aftermath of the Civil War is named Camp Hammond, in the Torch's honor. A statue of Hammond on the grounds bears the inscription "JIM HAMMOND, THE FIRST OF THE MARVELS: He showed us that heroes can be made". When the camp was shut down by Norman Osborn, an angry mob tore down the statue.

Avengers/Invaders
The original Human Torch appears in the Avengers/Invaders maxi-series alongside his fellow Invaders when an incident takes them from the battlefields of World War II to the present Marvel Universe, where they encounter both the New Avengers and Mighty Avengers. During his time in the future, the Torch briefly attempts to 'lead' S.H.I.E.L.D.'s Life Model Decoys against the organization in the belief that they are sentient machines that have been enslaved by the agency, but it is revealed that he has been deceived by Ultron, who had infiltrated the Helicarrier.

Weaponization
Some time after his destruction, the pieces of his body are gathered and reassembled in a secret UN lab, until stolen by a squad of mercenaries led by Batroc the Leaper, at the behest of the Chinese science-villain Professor Pandemic. As a young boy, the Professor was rescued from Japanese authorities by the Invaders, and was fascinated by the Torch. Now, he intends to use the technology to further his goals. Captain America (James Barnes), Black Widow, and the Sub-Mariner race to prevent this from happening. The Professor used the Torch's chemistry and cell structure to create an airborne virus that can spontaneously kill people. The Professor plans to use this virus to eradicate half of Earth's population. Luckily, Cap is able to stop this and made sure that Jim received a proper burial.

The Torch
At the beginning of Dark Reign, the recently resurrected Toro is captured by A.I.M. during an attempt to kill the Mad Thinker. Initial experimentation on Toro makes the Mad Thinker realize that he can reconstruct the Torch. A.I.M. steals the Torch's body from Arlington National Cemetery for experimentation.

After the Mad Thinker and A.I.M. spent months experimenting on the Torch's corpse and on the captive Toro they are able to resurrect the Torch, but it seems all memories of his past have disappeared. The Mad Thinker gains complete control of the Torch using "Compound D", a synthetic molecule he adapted from the Torch's cells (H42N2C2O6), which he dubs "Horton cells". Meanwhile, Toro's powers begin to manifest themselves again and a startling discovery proves that Toro's mutation may have been created as a result of his mother working for Horton.

Torch is now a weapon of mass destruction, and quickly reduces an entire town to debris, killing everyone and everything in sight after destroying several Estonian air force jets. An escape attempt by Toro damages the control mechanism and sets the Torch free. He immediately returns to the A.I.M. carrier and he begins murdering everyone in sight (again). The Mad Thinker reveals that he has managed to synthesize more of the Compound D which can interact with living organisms and control them. As he teleports to safety from the Torch killing spree the compound starts pouring into the ocean. It reaches an Atlantean settlement below, as it was being visited by Namor, and infects the population.

As the Compound D infection spreads through New York, the Torch battles an infected Sub-Mariner and learns the nature of Compound D after Sub-Mariner attempts to infect him. Sub-Mariner is defeated and while Reed Richards can create an antidote, he cannot create enough of it fast enough. The Torch, Toro, and Johnny Storm team up and attack the Mad Thinker's base and the Thinker at first refuses to cooperate until the Torch threatens that he will scorch the Earth clean to defeat Compound D, starting with the Thinker. The Thinker realizes that the Torch is telling the truth as the Torch's emotions, memories, and humanity are still recovering from his recent demise and restoration and provides the antidote but warns them of it and teleports away. The antidote is released and all infected victims are cured but Reed Richards determines that the antidote breaks down all Horton cells, not just Compound D and that the Torch has only a few days before he is destroyed.

Toro attempts to investigate his past to learn of his parents' association with Professor Horton and learns that some Horton cell prototypes were stolen long ago. The Torch is visited by the Golden Age Vision who advises him to seek out Toro and aid him while he still can. Their quest takes them across the world to where an underground society called "New Berlin" exists and the population is educated under the premise that the Axis powers won WW2; people who leave the underground city burst into flames and are incinerated. The leader of this colony lures the Mad Thinker to it and then holds him captive to coerce him to cooperate. It is revealed that all citizens of New Berlin are in fact androids created from the unstable prototype Horton cells and that the atmosphere of the colony is saturated with anti-combustion chemicals to keep the citizens intact, however this also prevents Toro and the Torch from using their powers and they are captured.

The Thinker helps stabilize the New Berlin leader's weapon, the android Inhuman Torch so that it can function without destroying itself due to the prototype Horton cells. However the Thinker also aids in freeing the Torch and Toro, and despite the Torch still dying from the Compound D antidote engages the Inhuman Torch in battle. The Inhuman Torch however can easily control, absorb, and manipulate all flame and siphons the flame from the Torch and Toro. However the Torch bids Toro farewell and reignites himself and engages the Inhuman Torch in a final fight. The Torch at first offers to aid the Inhuman Torch in learning about itself and humanity but it refuses and the Torch then channels his nova flame into the Inhuman Torch which overloads it and renders it a fused and inert statue, however a side effect of using his nova flame this time was that it deactivated the enzyme that breaks down Horton cells and thus the Torch's life is saved. They bid farewell to New Berlin and the Golden Age Vision takes them back to New York. The Thinker escapes and reveals that the leader of "New Berlin" is himself an android due to the actual founder of the city being unable to have children of his own. The leader of New Berlin didn't believe this until he left the city and exploded into flame and was incinerated.

Secret Avengers
The Torch is later offered membership in the Secret Avengers by Captain America after Hawkeye takes over as the team's leader. During his first mission with the group, the Secret Avengers travel to the Core, a subterranean city inhabited by an advanced race of robots called Descendants. The Torch finds that he is worshiped by the Descendants, who respectfully refer to him as "Grandfather". During an encounter with a cyborg resembling the original Miss America, the Torch learns that the city was created by a man known as the Father, who created the Descendants back in the 1940s as part of a failed attempt to replicate Professor Horton's work. The Torch is badly damaged during the Avengers' escape from the Core, and is placed in stasis until his body can be repaired.

Black Ant later frees the Torch and teleports him back to the Core, where he is repaired by Father. There, the Torch sides with the Descendants, realizing that he never quite fit in with humans. He then leads an army of robots during a raid on New York City, with the goal of forcibly assimilating the human race through the use of nanotechnology. The Torch eventually realizes that he had been brainwashed, and destroys the Orb of Necromancy, the mystical artifact that granted life to the descendants. Although the human race is saved, the Descendants are all killed as a result. Distraught, the Torch quits the Avengers and flies off to parts unknown.

All-New Invaders
A number of months after his resignation from the Avengers, Hammond is shown living in a small town called Blaketon, now working as a mechanic. He is forced to abandon his new life after being attacked by a squadron of Kree soldiers, resuming his identity as the Human Torch once again. After being saved by the intervention of Captain America and the Winter Soldier, the Torch joins the newly reformed Invaders.

When the Fantastic Four are declared to be unfit guardians for the children of the Future Foundation, Hammond offers to take custody of the children to provide a guardian that the FF can trust who they know will do all that he can to reunite them with their parents, even threatening to leave S.H.I.E.L.D. if he is forced to make a choice between the agency and his promise to protect the children. During the final confrontation with the forces of Counter-Earth – unleashed by the mysterious Quiet Man as part of his plan against the FF – Sleepwalker revealed that Hammond had a soul despite his artificial origin.

Physiology
Earlier writers portrayed the Torch's body as anatomically identical to human, but made out of synthetic material. Correspondingly, the Torch was shown to have human needs and human weaknesses; he has been felled by drugs, poison gas, hypnotic and telepathic attacks in both Golden Age stories and the Invaders series from the 1970s. The Torch has a heart, lungs, circulatory and digestive systems, and has been shown sleeping, eating, and drinking on more than one occasion. Toro has humorously implied that the Torch has normal human excretory functions. This concept of a living, artificial human made of synthetic flesh and blood was unique in comics, as opposed to the much more common theme of a mechanical automaton that only externally resembles a human being.

After the Mad Thinker's modification and reactivation of the Torch, writers began to portray him as clearly mechanical, containing circuits, relays, and motors, much like a traditional robot. This variable presentation of his anatomy remains an unresolved issue, whether an overlooked continuity error or explained within the fictional context of the stories. After his creation by Phineas Horton, many others have examined and experimented on the Torch's body, including the Mad Thinker, Zhang Chin, Henry Pym, and unspecified scientists working for the United Nations. It is unclear if any of these entities have made additions to the Torch's original body design that could explain the appearance of his mechanical components. Captain America #47 describes the Torch's anatomy as biologically based, moving the pendulum back in the other direction: the Torch's body has both DNA and a cellular structure, according to Zhang Chin. Other writers have continued to emphasize the Torch's mechanical aspects, both in terms of showing metallic body components and references to the Torch having 'programming' that can be altered.

The Mad Thinker has stated that the Torch's organs are composed of "Horton cells" – synthetic replicas of human cells using plastic and carbon polymers that duplicate the structures found in organic human cells. These cells can be grown in a culture, and are compatible with human and mutant physiology. Even in small clusters, they are capable of generating and storing a remarkable amount of power:
 While traveling inside the Human Torch in miniaturized form, Scott Lang temporarily gained a version of the Torch's powers after coming in contact with one of the cells that powers the Torch. (This is an homage to a similar incident in which Henry Pym entered the Vision's body and was temporarily rendered intangible.)
 The Pyronanos, a type of nanomachine-based artificial beings, were created using cells secretly extracted from Jim Hammond.
 Compound D, a mind control substance created by the Mad Thinker, is made from Horton cells.
 Thomas "Toro" Raymond, the Torch's teenaged sidekick, is a mutant who was exposed to Horton cells as a child. The cells bonded to his nervous system and caused his powers to manifest as an exact duplicate of the Torch's.

Of particular note is the Torch's synthetic blood, which in addition to being a universal blood type has been shown to have remarkable restorative properties:
 A "blood transfusion" from the Torch gave Spitfire her superspeed powers, and prevented her conversion to one of the undead; a second transfusion decades later saved her life and restored her youth. Aware of the initial transformation, the Hyena obtained a blood specimen from the Torch in the hopes of creating an army of Nazi speedsters. A similar transfusion to Warrior Woman reversed much of her brain damage and restored her health and power.
 The robot Ultron reported he could "taste life" after drinking the Torch's blood.

Powers and abilities
The Human Torch is a synthetic being designed and constructed of artificial materials. He has the capacity for creative intelligence, unlimited self-motivated activity, and human-like emotions. The Torch has the ability to envelop his body in fiery plasma without harm to himself and to utilize this heat energy for various effects, including flight, formation of fiery shapes, energy releases in the form of heat blasts, "nova flame bursts" (highest intensity heat blasts, similar to the heat-pulse of a nuclear warhead), and concussive force blasts. The Torch has the ability to control ambient heat energy in his immediate environment, which allows him to control flames not of his own generation, makes him immune to the effects of external heat and to absorb heat from other sources. The Torch's flame can be extinguished by lack of oxygen, or by smothering materials such as water, sand, fire-fighting foam, or heat-resistant blankets unless his flame is at such intensity that it immediately vaporizes such materials on contact.

While in flame form, the original Human Torch has engaged in hand-to-hand combat with Namor, the Sub-Mariner. He has also dug underground and through vessels like a human missile.

The upper limit of his resistance has been undefined over the years, having once walked out stronger from a nuclear blast, and on another time considered destroyed by another nuclear blast, this last one happening in the last issue of New Invaders.

The Torch was a member of the NYPD in the 1940s, and has police academy training. He has received some training in unarmed combat by Captain America, and is an expert in the combat use of his superhuman powers. The Torch is also an accomplished street fighter.

The Torch can live without oxygen, entering a stasis mode.

Reception
In 2012, Hammond was ranked 28th in IGN's list of "The Top 50 Avengers".

In other media

Television
 The android Human Torch appears in The Super Hero Squad Show episode "World War Witch!", voiced by Jim Cummings.

Film
 The android Human Torch makes a cameo appearance in Captain America: The First Avenger at the 1943 Stark Expo as a Synthezoid on display in an oxygen-deprived glass tube coined "The Synthetic Man".

Video games
 The Jim Hammond persona of Human Torch appears in Lego Marvel's Avengers, voiced by Sam Riegel.
 Jim Hammond appears as a playable character in Marvel Puzzle Quest.

Collected editions

See also
 Ajax the Sun Man, a similar character published by Street & Smith
 The Fire Man, a similar character published by Centaur Publications
 Fiery Mask, a similar character published by Timely
 Pyroman, a similar character published by Nedor Comics

References

External links
 Human Torch (android) at Marvel.com
 The Grand Comics Database
 The Golden Age Human Torch

Avengers (comics) characters
Characters created by Carl Burgos
Comics characters introduced in 1939
Fictional androids
Fictional characters from Brooklyn
Fictional characters with fire or heat abilities
Fictional New York City Police Department officers
Golden Age comics titles
Golden Age superheroes
Marvel Comics robots
Marvel Comics superheroes
Marvel Comics titles
Timely Comics characters